Latomeio (also: Latomi or Karathodoreika) is a small village of Polykastro municipality, Kilkis regional unit. Its inhabitants were 12 people in 2001 census.  The former name was  Spantzovon or Spantzion until 1928. It is 5km northeast of Polykastro, near the international road Thessaloniki - Belgrade.

It was abandoned in 1920 after the Neuilly treaty and it was re-inhabited by two Sarakatsani clans (Karathodoros': 5 families  and Arkoudas': 1 family), which used to transfer their sheep in Vermion Mountains, in summer.

References 

 Dicaeos Vassiliadis, "History of Polykastro"

Populated places in Kilkis (regional unit)